The 2017 IIHF World Championship Division I was an international ice hockey tournament run by the International Ice Hockey Federation. Group A was contested in Kyiv, Ukraine from 22 to 28 April 2017 and Group B in Belfast, United Kingdom from 23 to 29 April 2017. South Korea and Austria were promoted to the 2018 World Championship. It marked the first time South Korea had earned promotion to the top tier of the World Championship.

Bids
There were two official bids to host Group A Championships.

  Austria
  Ukraine
 Kyiv
Ukraine had never hosted these championships, however, they did host an Olympic Pre-Qualification round in 2012. The proposed arena was the Palace of Sports.

The decision on who hosts the tournament was decided on May 20, 2016. The bid from Ukraine gained a majority vote against the Austrian entry.

There were also two official bids to host Group B Championships.

  Estonia
 Tallinn
Estonia last hosted these championships in 2006. The proposed arena was Tallinn Arena.

  United Kingdom
 Belfast
The United Kingdom had never hosted these championships, however, they did play host to the IIHF Group B Championships in 1952, and again in 1993. The proposed arena was the Odyssey Arena.

The decision on who hosts the tournament was decided on May 20, 2016. The bid from the United Kingdom received 18 votes, whilst the Estonia bid received 7.

Venues

Group A tournament

Participants

Match officials
7 referees and 7 linesmen were selected for the tournament.

Referees
 Andris Ansons
 Daniel Gamper
 Jacob Grumsen
 Roy Stian Hansen
 Andreas Harnebring
 Vladimír Pešina
 Jeremy Tufts

Linesmen
 Riley Bowles
 Franco Castelli
 Maxime Chaput
 Daniel Hynek
 Artem Korepanov
 Ulrich Pardatscher
 Daniel Persson

Standings

Results
All times are local (UTC+3).

Awards and statistics

Awards

Best players selected by the directorate:
Best Goalkeeper:  Bernhard Starkbaum
Best Defenseman:  Dominique Heinrich
Best Forward:  Nigel Dawes
Source: IIHF.com

Media All-Stars:
 MVP:  Thomas Raffl
 Goalkeeper:  Bernhard Starkbaum
 Defenceman:  Dominique Heinrich /  Alex Plante
 Forwards:  Nigel Dawes /  Thomas Raffl /  Konstantin Komarek
Source: IIHF.com

Scoring leaders
List shows the top skaters sorted by points, then goals.

GP = Games played; G = Goals; A = Assists; Pts = Points; +/− = Plus/minus; PIM = Penalties in minutes; POS = Position
Source: IIHF.com

Goaltending leaders
Only the top five goaltenders, based on save percentage, who have played at least 40% of their team's minutes, are included in this list.

TOI = Time on ice (minutes:seconds); SA = Shots against; GA = Goals against; GAA = Goals against average; Sv% = Save percentage; SO = Shutouts
Source: IIHF.com

Group B tournament

Participants

Match officials
4 referees and 7 linesmen were selected for the tournament.

Referees
 Geoffrey Barcelo
 Gergely Kincses
 Kristijan Nikolic
 Milan Zrnić

Linesmen
 Ally Flockhart
 James Kavanagh
 Márton Németh
 David Nothegger
 Mariusz Smura
 Vladimir Suslov
 Alexander Sysuev

Standings

Results
All times are local (UTC+1).

Awards and statistics

Awards
Best players selected by the directorate:
Best Goalkeeper:  Yutaka Fukufuji
Best Defenseman:  Ben O'Connor
Best Forward:  Colin Shields
Source: IIHF.com

Scoring leaders
List shows the top skaters sorted by points, then goals.

GP = Games played; G = Goals; A = Assists; Pts = Points; +/− = Plus/minus; PIM = Penalties in minutes; POS = Position
Source: IIHF.com

Goaltending leaders
Only the top five goaltenders, based on save percentage, who have played at least 40% of their team's minutes, are included in this list.

TOI = Time on ice (minutes:seconds); SA = Shots against; GA = Goals against; GAA = Goals against average; Sv% = Save percentage; SO = Shutouts
Source: IIHF.com

References

2017
Division I
2017 IIHF World Championship Division I
2017 IIHF World Championship Division I
IIHF World Championship Division I
IIHF World Championship Division I
2017 IIHF World Championship Division I
2017 IIHF World Championship Division I
April 2017 sports events in Europe
2010s in Kyiv
21st century in Belfast
2017 in Northern Ireland sport